Leucine rich repeat and fibronectin type III domain containing 4 is a protein that in humans is encoded by the LRFN4 gene.

See also 
Fibronectin type III domain
Leucine rich repeat

References

Further reading